Rolla Coral McMillen (October 5, 1880 – May 6, 1961) was a U.S. Representative from Illinois.

Born near Monticello, Illinois, McMillen attended the public schools of Monticello, Illinois (Monticello High School), and the University of Illinois. He graduated from the University of Michigan Law School in 1906. He was admitted to the bar the same year and commenced practice in Decatur, Illinois with Clark A. McMillen, to whom he was not related, in the firm of McMillen & McMillen.
He served as delegate to the Republican National Convention in 1940. He served as member of State housing board 1940–1944.

McMillen was elected as a Republican to the Seventy-eighth Congress to fill the vacancy caused by the death of William H. Wheat.
He was reelected to the Seventy-ninth, Eightieth, and Eighty-first Congresses, and served from June 13, 1944, to January 3, 1951. He was not a candidate for renomination in 1950.

He died in Evanston, Illinois, May 6, 1961. He was interred in Greenwood Cemetery, Decatur, Illinois.

References

External links
 

1880 births
1961 deaths
People from Decatur, Illinois
University of Illinois Urbana-Champaign alumni
University of Michigan Law School alumni
Republican Party members of the United States House of Representatives from Illinois
20th-century American politicians
People from Monticello, Illinois